Assiniboia-Bengough was a provincial electoral district for the Legislative Assembly of Saskatchewan, Canada. This constituency was created from the riding of Bengough and parts of other ridings before the 1971 Saskatchewan general election. This riding was only in existence for a few years, being replaced by the ridings of Bengough-Milestone and Assiniboia-Gravelbourg before the 1975 Saskatchewan general election.

Member of the Legislative Assembly

Election results

|-

 
|style="width: 130px"|PC
|James A. Hall
|align="right"|415
|align="right"|7.75
|align="right"|-
|- bgcolor="white"
!align="left" colspan=3|Total
!align="right"|5,355
!align="right"|100.00
!align="right"|

See also
Electoral district (Canada)
List of Saskatchewan provincial electoral districts
List of Saskatchewan general elections
List of political parties in Saskatchewan

References
 Saskatchewan Archives Board: Saskatchewan Executive and Legislative Directory

Former provincial electoral districts of Saskatchewan